The first fortifications of Singapore consisted of batteries built in the early 19th century to protect the harbour and city. After this there were two main phases of building. 

From the 1860's technological changes started to render the existing fortifications obsolete.  Steam powered warships were faster and carried improved armour.  Artillery also improved; Smooth Bore (SB) cannons were replaced with Rifled Muzzle Loading (RML) and then in the 1890's Breech Loading (BL) guns were introduced. These changes coupled with increased threats from Russia and France resulted in a need to upgrade the fortifications. The first phase was instigated by William Jervois whilst he was Governor of Singapore in the 1870's

The second phase was prior to the Second World War and was to counter the threat posed by Japan with a building program implemented in 1933. The focus of the defences moved to the protection of the Eastern entrance to the Johore strait which guarded the entrance to the Singapore Naval Base.  A number of the existing batteries were upgraded and new more powerful 15" guns and AMTB (Anti Motor Torpedo Boat) Batteries were added to the fortress.

The early fortifications of Singapore

Fortifications built between 1875 and 1910

World War II Coastal Batteries

Fortress Singapore During World War 2 

The main purpose of the guns was to prevent an attack on Singapore Island and the important Naval Base from the sea. A popular myth after the loss of Singapore in February 1942 was that the guns were "impressive but useless: the guns on Singapore pointed the wrong way"  and hence could not fire on the advancing Japanese. In reality this was not true. By 1939 most of the batteries had been modified to improve their arcs of fire. During the Battle of Singapore a number of batteries were actively engaged firing over 2000 shells (Changi Fire Command consumed an estimated 1,119 shells and Faber Fire Command 1,072).

The fire of the guns however was not that effective, Armour-Piercing (AP) ammunition was more suitable for use against ships and that the necessary fire control preparations had not been made.

Prior to the surrender the garrison rendered all guns unusable. This activity was very successful and the Japanese were only able to repair 4 of the 52 guns that had been in use.

Fixed Defences for Fortress Singapore were under the command of Brigadier A.D. Curtis who had three Royal Artillery Regiments manning the guns: The 7th and 9th Coast Regiments and the 16th Defence Regiment. These regiments included three batteries manned by the Hong Kong and Singapore Royal Artillery (HKSRA)

Faber Fire Command - Under Command of Lt. Col. Hereward Douglas St. George Cardew and was manned by the 7th Coast Regiment, Royal Artillery. The fire command controlled the guns protecting the South of the Island and Singapore City
 

Changi Fire Command  - Under command Lt. Col. Charles Philip Heath and was manned by the 9th Coast Regiment, Royal Artillery. The fire command controlled the Eastern approaches of the Island and protected the entrance to the Johore Strait and the Naval Base. 

The 16th Defence Regiment, Royal Artillery - Under Command of Lt. Col. M.S.H. Maxwell-Gumbleton had two batteries of 18-Pdrs (966 and 968 Defence Batteries) and 1 battery of 2-pdr (967 Defence Battery). 

It was planned to use the 18-pdrs in pairs for beach defence. Twenty four Beach Defence (BD) positions were planned with  BD1 was located near Pasir Laba Battery and BD24 was at Pengerang. It is not clear how many of these were actually deployed.

Post War Batteries 

Keppel Fire Command - Mount Serapong

Further reading 

 The Fatal Fortress: The Guns and Fortifications of Singapore 1819 - 1953 by Bill Clements

References

External links 

 Fort Siloso
British Artillery Defences of Penang and Singapore

Coastal fortifications
Military history of Singapore